Gomphodontosuchus is an extinct genus of cynodonts. It was created to describe the species Gomphodontosuchus brasiliensis.

Species
Gomphodontosuchus brasiliensis was first collected in 1928 by Friedrich von Huene in Santa Maria Formation, the Geopark of Paleorrota, Brazil.

References

 Paleobiology Database 39207
 Paleobiology Database 100826
 UNVERSIDADE FEDERAL DO RIO GRANDE DO SUL

Traversodontids
Prehistoric cynodont genera
Late Triassic synapsids of South America
Fossil taxa described in 1928
Taxa named by Friedrich von Huene